The 8th constituency of the Pas-de-Calais is a French legislative constituency in the Pas-de-Calais département.

Description

Pas-de-Calais' 8th constituency is based around the town of Saint-Omer, close to the border with Nord.

Politically the seat bears a close resemblance to others in Pas-de-Calais as it strongly supported the left. This constituency elected Michel Lefait in 1997 after a brief tenure by the conservative Rally for the Republic who captured the seat in the landslide victory at the 1993 elections.

Historic representation

Election results

2023 by-election 
Bertrand Petit's original election was annulled, but he won the by-election held on 30 January 2023. Unlike in the 2022 election, his candidacy was endorsed by NUPES.

2022

 
 
 
 
 
 
 
|-
| colspan="8" bgcolor="#E9E9E9"|
|-
 
 

 
 
 
 
 

* PS dissident

2017

2012

 
 
 
 
|-
| colspan="8" bgcolor="#E9E9E9"|
|-

2007

2002

 
 
 
 
 
 
|-
| colspan="8" bgcolor="#E9E9E9"|
|-

1997

References

Sources
 Official results of French elections from 1998: 

8